Ekata is a small village in the north-eastern region of Gabon in the province of Ogooué-Ivindo near the Congo border.

References

Populated places in Ogooué-Ivindo Province